Daniel Alfred Sanborn (April 5, 1827 in Somerville, MassachusettsApril 11, 1883 in Brooklyn, New York) was a surveyor who founded the Sanborn Map Company, a well-known provider of fire insurance maps. 

Before starting his company he produced insurance maps for Boston and several cities in Tennessee for the Aetna Insurance Company.  He was originally hired by Aetna because they were impressed by his work on a Boston Atlas.  In 1867 he formed the D.A. Sanborn National Insurance Diagram Bureau in New York City.

References

External links
Sanborn Map Company
 Sanborn Fire Insurance Maps at University of Utah Digital Library, Marriott Library Special Collections

1827 births
1883 deaths
People from Somerville, Massachusetts
19th-century American businesspeople
American company founders